The 16th New Zealand Parliament was a term of the New Zealand Parliament. It was elected at the 1905 general election in December of that year.

Changes to the electoral law
The 1903 City Single Electorates Act declared that at the dissolution of the 15th Parliament, the four multi-member electorates would be abolished and replaced each with three single-member electorates. It was also the year absentee voting was introduced for all electors unable to be in their own electorate on election day. The first Chief Electoral Officer was appointed.

 
 
 
 
 
 
 
 
 
 
 
 

Nine of these twelve electorates had existed before. Wellington Central, Wellington North, and Dunedin North were established for the first time.

1905 general election

The 1905 general election was held on Wednesday, 6 December in the general electorates and on Wednesday, 20 December in the Māori electorates, respectively.  A total of 80 MPs were elected; 38 represented North Island electorates, 38 represented South Island electorates, and the remaining four represented Māori electorates.  476,473 voters were enrolled and the official turnout at the election was 83.3%.

Sessions
The 16th Parliament sat for four sessions (there were two sessions in 1906), and was prorogued on 29 October 1908.

Ministries
The Liberal Government of New Zealand had taken office on 24 January 1891.  The Seddon Ministry under Richard Seddon had taken office in 1893 during the term of the 11th Parliament.  The Seddon Ministry remained in power for the whole term of this Parliament and held power until Seddon's death on 10 June 1906. Seddon was travelling overseas at the time of his death, and William Hall-Jones was a reluctant acting Premier at the time. Joseph Ward would normally have been acting Premier, but he was also overseas. So upon Seddon's death, Hall-Jones was sworn in as Prime Minister (the first time this new title was used) and formed the Hall-Jones Ministry on 21 June 1906.  Upon Ward's return from overseas, the leadership was offered to him, which he accepted.  Hall-Jones resigned as Prime Minister, succeeded by Ward who formed the Ward Ministry on 6 August 1906. The Ward Ministry remained in power for the remainder of the parliamentary term and subsequently until Ward's resignation as Prime Minister in 1912.

Party composition

Start of term

Initial composition of the 16th Parliament

By-elections during 16th Parliament
There were a number of changes during the term of the 16th Parliament.

Notes

References

16